The 1999 Chicago Marathon was the 22nd running of the annual marathon race in Chicago, United States and was held on October 24. The elite men's race was won by Morocco's Khalid Khannouchi in a time of 2:05:42 hours and the women's race was won by Kenya's Joyce Chepchumba in 2:25:59. Khannouchi's winning time was a marathon world record, and only his third outing over the distance. That record stood for two and a half years before the Moroccan beat it again at the 2002 London Marathon.

Results

Men

Women

References

Results. Association of Road Racing Statisticians. Retrieved 2020-04-10.

External links 
 Official website

Chicago Marathon
Chicago
1990s in Chicago
1999 in Illinois
Chicago Marathon
Chicago Marathon